Eugene F. Lynch (December 2, 1931 – October 9, 2019) was a United States district judge of the United States District Court for the Northern District of California.

Education and career
Born in San Francisco, California, Lynch received a Bachelor of Science degree from the Santa Clara University in 1953 and a Bachelor of Laws from the University of California, Hastings College of the Law in 1958. He was in the United States Army from 1953 to 1955 and became a captain. He was in private practice in San Francisco from 1959 to 1971. He was a judge on the Municipal Court of San Francisco, California from 1971 to 1974. He was a judge on the Superior Court of the City and County of San Francisco, California from 1974 to 1982.

Federal judicial service

Lynch was nominated by President Ronald Reagan on January 25, 1982, to a seat on the United States District Court for the Northern District of California vacated by Judge Charles Byron Renfrew. He was confirmed by the United States Senate on March 4, 1982, and received his commission on March 9, 1982. He assumed senior status on March 14, 1997. Lynch served in that capacity until his retirement from the federal bench on July 12, 1997.

References

Sources
 

1931 births
2019 deaths
Lawyers from San Francisco
Military personnel from California
California state court judges
Judges of the United States District Court for the Northern District of California
United States district court judges appointed by Ronald Reagan
20th-century American judges
Santa Clara University alumni
University of California, Hastings College of the Law alumni
United States Army officers
Superior court judges in the United States